Essex was an American whaling ship from Nantucket, Massachusetts, which was launched in 1799. In 1820, while at sea in the southern Pacific Ocean under the command of Captain George Pollard Jr., the ship was attacked and sunk by a sperm whale. Thousands of miles from the coast of South America with little food and water, the 21-man crew was forced to make for land in the ship's surviving whaleboats.

The men suffered severe dehydration, starvation, and exposure on the open ocean, and the survivors eventually resorted to eating the bodies of the crewmen who had died. When that proved insufficient, members of the crew drew lots to determine whom they would sacrifice so that the others could live. Seven crew members were cannibalized before the last of the eight survivors were rescued, more than three months after the sinking of the Essex. First mate Owen Chase and cabin boy Thomas Nickerson later wrote accounts of the ordeal. The tragedy attracted international attention, and inspired Herman Melville to write his famous 1851 novel Moby-Dick.

Ship and crew
By the time of her fateful voyage, Essex was already twenty years old, but because so many of her previous voyages had been profitable, she had gained a reputation as a "lucky" vessel. Captain George Pollard Jr. and first mate Owen Chase had served together on the ship's previous trip, which had been highly successful and led to their promotions. In 1819, at the age of 29, Pollard was one of the youngest men ever to command a whaling ship; Chase was 23, and the youngest member of the crew was the cabin boy, Thomas Nickerson, who was 14. The crew of 21 was mainly white, but a few were free black men. 

Essex had recently been totally refitted, but at only  in length, and measuring about 239 tons burthen, she was small for a whaleship.

Final voyage
Essex departed from Nantucket on August 12, 1819, on what was expected to be a roughly two-and-a-half-year voyage to the bountiful whaling grounds off the west coast of South America. The crew numbered 21 men in total. Among the sailors, there were seven black men: William Bond, Samuel Reed, Richard Peterson, Henry DeWitt, Lawson Thomas, Charles Shorter and Isaiah Sheppard; four individuals from places other than Nantucket: Seth Weeks, Joseph West, William Wright, and Isaac Cole; and one Englishman named Thomas Chapple. Captain George Pollard, First Mate Owen Chase, Second Mate Matthew Joy, and the rest of the crew, Barzillai Ray, Charles Ramsdell, Benjamin Lawrence and Owen Coffin, and cabin boy Thomas Nickerson, were all from Nantucket.

Two days after her departure from Nantucket, Essex was hit by a sudden squall in the Gulf Stream. She was knocked on her beam-ends and nearly sank. She lost her topgallant sail and two whaleboats were destroyed, with an additional whaleboat damaged. Captain Pollard elected to continue the voyage without replacing the two boats or repairing the damage.

Essex rounded Cape Horn in January 1820 after a transit of five weeks, which was extremely slow. With this and the unsettling earlier incident, the crew began to talk of ill omens. Their spirits were temporarily lifted when Essex began the long spring and summer hunt in the warm waters of the South Pacific Ocean, traveling north along the western coast of South America up to Atacames, in what was then the Spanish-ruled territory of the Royal Audience of Quito (present-day Ecuador).

Whaling grounds depleted
The crew was divided into three groups of six, each of which manned one of the three usable whaleboats whenever whales were sighted; the remaining three men stayed aboard to manage Essex. Each whaleboat was led by one of the three officers – Pollard, Chase, and Joy – each of whom then chose his five other crew members.

In September 1820, a sailor named Henry DeWitt deserted at Atacames, reducing the crew of Essex to 20 men. While sailors fled whaling ships all the time, the desertion was bad news for Captain Pollard because each of the ship's three whaleboats required a crew of six. This meant only two men would remain to keep Essex while a whale-hunt was in progress, which was not sufficient to safely handle a ship of Essexs size and type.

This was an immense distance from known shores for the whalers, and the crew had heard rumors that cannibals populated the many islands of the South Pacific.

Repairs and resupply at Galápagos
To restock their food supplies for the long journey, Essex sailed for Charles Island (later renamed Floreana Island) in the Galápagos Islands. The crew needed to fix a serious leak and initially anchored off Hood Island (now known as Española Island) on October 8, 1820. During a week at anchor, they captured 300 Galápagos giant tortoises to supplement the ship's food stores. They then sailed for Charles Island, where on October 22 they took another 60 tortoises. The tortoises weighed between  each. The sailors captured them alive and allowed some of them to roam the ship at will; the rest they kept in the hold. They believed the tortoises were capable of living for a year without eating or drinking water (though in fact the tortoises slowly starved). The sailors considered the tortoises delicious and extremely nutritious, and planned to butcher them at sea as needed.

While hunting on Charles Island, helmsman Thomas Chapple decided to set a fire as a prank. It was the height of the dry season, and the fire quickly burned out of control, surrounding the hunters and forcing them to run through the flames to escape. By the time the men returned to Essex, almost the entire island was burning. The crew was upset about the fire, and Captain Pollard swore vengeance on whoever had set it. The next day, the island was still burning as the ship sailed for the offshore grounds. After a full day of sailing, the fire was still visible on the horizon. Fearing a certain whipping, Chapple only later admitted that he had set the fire.

Many years later, Nickerson returned to Charles Island and found a blackened wasteland; he observed "neither trees, shrubbery, nor grass have since appeared". It has been suggested that the fire contributed to the near-extinction of the Floreana Island tortoise and the Floreana mockingbird, which no longer inhabit the island.

Offshore ground
When Essex finally reached the promised fishing grounds thousands of miles west of the coast of South America, the crew was unable to find any whales for days. Tension mounted among the officers of Essex, especially between Pollard and Chase. When they finally found a whale on November 16, it surfaced directly beneath Chase's boat, with the result that the boat was "dashed ... literally in pieces".

At eight in the morning of November 20, 1820, the lookout sighted spouts, and the three remaining whaleboats set out to pursue a pod of sperm whales. On the leeward side of Essex, Chase's whaleboat harpooned a whale, but its tail struck the boat and opened up a seam, forcing the crew to cut the harpoon line and return to Essex for repairs. Two miles away off the windward side, Pollard's and Joy's boats each harpooned a whale and were dragged towards the horizon away from Essex in what whalers called a "Nantucket sleighride".

Whale attack
It lay motionless on the surface facing the ship and then began to swim towards the vessel, picking up speed by shallow diving. The whale rammed Essex, rocking her from side to side, and then dove under her, surfacing close on the ship's starboard side. As its head lay alongside the bow and the tail by the stern, it was motionless and appeared to be stunned. Chase prepared to harpoon it from the deck when he realized that its tail was only inches from the rudder, which the whale could easily destroy if provoked by an attempt to kill it. Fearing to leave the ship stuck thousands of miles from land with no way to steer it, Chase hesitated. The whale recovered, swam several hundred yards forward of the ship, and turned to face the ship's bow.

The whale crushed the bow, driving the vessel backwards, and then finally disengaged its head from the shattered timbers and swam off, never to be seen again, leaving Essex quickly going down by the bow. Chase and the remaining sailors frantically tried to add rigging to the only remaining whaleboat, while the steward William Bond ran below to gather the captain's sea chest and whatever navigational aids he could find.

The cause of the whale's aggression is not known. In In the Heart of the Sea, author Nathaniel Philbrick speculated that it may have first struck the boat accidentally, or have had its curiosity aroused by the sound of a hammer as a whaler worked to repair a damaged whaleboat by nailing in a replacement board. The frequency and sound of the nailing may have sounded similar to those made by bull sperm whales to communicate and echolocate.

Survivors

After spending two days salvaging what supplies they could from the waterlogged wreck, the 20 sailors prepared to set out in the three small whaleboats, aware that they had wholly inadequate supplies of food and fresh water for a journey to land. The boats were rigged with makeshift masts and sails taken from Essex, and boards were added to heighten the gunwales and prevent large waves from spilling over the sides. Inside Pollard's sea chest, which Bond's quick thinking had managed to save, were two sets of navigational equipment and two copies of maritime charts. These were split between Pollard's and Chase's boats; Joy's boat was left without any means of navigating except to keep within sight of the other boats.

Unable to sail against the trade winds, the boats would first need to sail south for  before they could take advantage of the Westerlies to turn towards South America, which then would still lie another  to the east. Even with the knowledge that this route would require them to travel twice as far as the route to the Marquesas, Pollard acceded to the crew's decision and the boats set their course due south.

Food and water were rationed from the beginning, but most of the food had been soaked in seawater. The men ate this food first even though it increased their thirst. It took them around two weeks to consume the contaminated food, and by this time the survivors were rinsing their mouths with seawater and drinking their own urine. Several of the giant tortoises captured from the Galápagos had been brought aboard the whaleboats as well, but their size prevented the crew from bringing all of them.

Never designed for long voyages, all the whaleboats had been very roughly repaired, and leaks were a constant and serious problem during the voyage. After losing a timber, the crew of one boat had to lean to one side to raise the other side out of the water until another boat was able to draw close, allowing a sailor to nail a piece of wood over the hole. Storms and rough seas frequently plagued the tiny whaleboats, and the men who were not occupied with steering and trimming the sails spent most of their time bailing water from the bilge.

Landfall
On December 20, exactly one month after the whale attack, and within hours of the crew beginning to die of thirst, the boats landed on uninhabited Henderson Island, a small uplifted coral atoll within the modern-day British territory of the Pitcairn Islands. The men incorrectly believed that they had landed on Ducie Island, a similar atoll  to the east. Had they landed on Pitcairn Island itself,  to the southwest, they might have received help; the descendants of the survivors of HMS Bounty, who had famously mutinied in 1789, still lived there.

On Henderson Island, Essexs crew found a small freshwater spring below the tideline and the starving men gorged themselves on endemic birds, crabs, eggs, and peppergrass. After just one week, they had largely exhausted the island's food resources. On 26 December, they concluded they would starve if they remained much longer. As most of the crew prepared to set sail in the whaleboats once again, three men – William Wright, Seth Weeks, and Thomas Chapple, the only white members of the crew who were not natives of Nantucket – opted to stay behind on Henderson. Almost a year after Essex sank, Lloyd's List reported that Surry had rescued the three men and taken them to Port Jackson, Australia.

Separation
The remaining Essex crewmen, now numbering 17 in 3 boats, resumed the journey on December 27 with the intention of reaching Easter Island. Within three days they had exhausted the crabs and birds they had stockpiled from Henderson in preparation for the voyage, leaving only a small reserve of the bread previously salvaged from Essex. One by one, the men began to die.

Second mate Matthew Joy, whose health had been poor even before Essex left Nantucket, was dying; as his condition steadily worsened, Joy asked if he could rest on Pollard's boat until his death. On January 10, Joy became the first crew member to die, and Nantucketer Obed Hendricks assumed the leadership of Joy's boat.

The following day, Chase's whaleboat, which also carried Richard Peterson, Isaac Cole, Benjamin Lawrence, and Thomas Nickerson, became separated from the others during a squall. Peterson, the oldest crew member, lost the will to live and died on January 18. As with Joy, he was sewn into his clothes and buried at sea, as was the custom. On February 8 Isaac Cole died, but with food running out the survivors kept his body, and after a discussion, the men resorted to cannibalism. They ate his liver and kidneys but struggled to eat the sinewy flesh.

Hendricks' boat, carrying crew members William Bond, Lawson Thomas, Charles Shorter, Isaiah Sheppard, and Joseph West, exhausted its food supplies on January 14, and Pollard offered to share his own boat's remaining provisions. Pollard's boat carried Samuel Reed, Owen Coffin, Barzillai Ray, and Charles Ramsdell. They ran out of food on January 21. Thomas died on January 20, and the others decided they had no choice but to keep the body for food. Shorter died on January 23, Sheppard on January 27, and Reed on January 28.

Later that day, the two boats separated; Hendricks' boat was never seen again. All three men are presumed to have died at sea. A whaleboat was later found washed up on Ducie Island with the skeletons of three people inside. Although it was suspected to be Obed Hendricks' missing boat, and the remains those of Hendricks, Bond, and West, the remains have never been positively identified.

By February 1, the food on Pollard's boat was again exhausted and the survivors' situation became dire. The men drew lots to determine who would be sacrificed for the survival of the remainder. A young man named Owen Coffin, Captain Pollard's 18-year-old first cousin, whom he had sworn to protect, drew the black spot. Pollard allegedly offered to protect his cousin, but Coffin is said to have replied: "No, I like my lot as well as any other". Lots were drawn again to determine who would be Coffin's executioner. His young friend, Charles Ramsdell, drew the black spot. Ramsdell shot Coffin; Ramsdell, Pollard, and Barzillai Ray consumed the body.

On February 11, Ray also died. For the remainder of their journey, Pollard and Ramsdell survived by gnawing on Coffin's and Ray's bones.

Rescue and reunion
By February 15, the three survivors of Chase's whaleboat had again run out of food. On February 18 – 89 days after Essex sank – off the coast of Chile the British vessel  spotted and rescued Chase, Lawrence, and Nickerson. Several days after the rescue, the empty whaleboat was lost in a storm while under tow behind Indian. Pollard's boat, now containing only Pollard and Ramsdell, was rescued when almost within sight of the Santa María Island in the South American coast by the Nantucket whaleship Dauphin, 93 days after Essex sank, on February 23. Pollard and Ramsdell by that time were so completely dissociative that they did not even notice Dauphin alongside them, and became terrified when they saw their rescuers. On March 5, Dauphin encountered , which was sailing to Valparaíso, and transferred the two men to her.

After a few days in Valparaíso, Chase, Lawrence, and Nickerson were transferred to the frigate  and placed under the care of the ship's doctor, who oversaw their recovery. After officials were informed that three Essex survivors – Wright, Weeks, and Chapple – had been left behind on Ducie Island (they were actually left on Henderson Island), the authorities asked the merchant vessel Surry, which already intended to sail across the Pacific, to look for the men. The rescue succeeded. On March 17, Pollard and Ramsdell were reunited with Chase, Lawrence, and Nickerson. By the time the last of the eight survivors were rescued on April 5, 1821, the corpses of seven fellow sailors had been consumed. All eight went to sea again within months of their return to Nantucket. Herman Melville later speculated that all would have survived had they followed Captain Pollard's recommendation and sailed to Tahiti.

Aftermath

 
Pollard returned to sea in early 1822 to captain the whaleship Two Brothers. She was wrecked on the French Frigate Shoals during a storm off the coast of Hawaii on his first voyage, after which he joined a merchant vessel, which was wrecked off the Sandwich Islands (Hawaiian Islands) shortly thereafter. By now Pollard was considered a "Jonah" (unlucky), and no ship owner would trust him to sail on a ship again, so he was forced to retire. He subsequently became Nantucket's night watchman. Every November 20, he would reportedly lock himself in his room and fast in memory of the men of Essex. He died in Nantucket on January 7, 1870, aged 78.

First Mate Owen Chase returned to Nantucket on June 11, 1821, to find he had a 14-month-old daughter he had never met. Four months later he had completed an account of the disaster, the Narrative of the Most Extraordinary and Distressing Shipwreck of the Whale-Ship Essex; Herman Melville used it as one of the inspirations for his novel Moby-Dick (1851). In December, Chase sailed as first mate on the whaler Florida, and then as captain of Winslow for each subsequent voyage, until he could afford to build his own whaler, Charles Carrol. Chase remained at sea for 19 years, only returning home for short periods every two or three years, each time fathering a child. His first two wives died while he was at sea. He divorced his third wife when he found she had given birth 16 months after he had last seen her, although he subsequently brought up the child as his own. In September 1840, two months after the divorce was finalized, he married for the fourth and final time and retired from whaling. Memories of the harrowing ordeal on Essex haunted Chase, and he suffered terrible headaches and nightmares. Later in his life, he began hiding food in the attic of his Nantucket house on Orange Street and was eventually institutionalized. He died in Nantucket on March 7, 1869, aged 73.

The cabin boy, Thomas Nickerson, became a captain in the Merchant Service and late in his life wrote his own account of the sinking, titled The Loss of the Ship "Essex" Sunk by a Whale and the Ordeal of the Crew in Open Boats. Nickerson wrote this account 56 years after the sinking, in 1876, and it was lost until 1960; the Nantucket Historical Association published it in 1984. He died in February 1883, aged 77.

The other surviving crew members met various fates:
Thomas Chapple died of plague fever in Timor, while working as a missionary.
William Wright was lost in a hurricane in the West Indies.
Charles Ramsdell died in Nantucket on July 8, 1866, aged 62.
Benjamin Lawrence died in Nantucket on March 28, 1879, aged 80.
Seth Weeks died in Barnstable County, Massachusetts, on September 12, 1887, the last of the Essex survivors to die.

Cultural works
As well as inspiring much of American author Herman Melville's classic 1851 novel Moby-Dick, the story of the Essex tragedy has been dramatized in film, television, and music:

 The dramatized documentary Revenge of the Whale (2001), was produced and broadcast on September 7, 2001, by NBC.
 Composer Deirdre Gribbin's 2004 string quartet What the Whaleship Saw was inspired by the event.
 The television movie The Whale (2013) was broadcast on BBC One on December 22, wherein an elderly Thomas Nickerson (played by Martin Sheen) recounted the events of Essex. Charles Furness played the younger Nickerson, Jonas Armstrong played Owen Chase, and Adam Rayner played Captain Pollard.
 The 2015 film In The Heart of the Sea, directed by Ron Howard, was based on Philbrick's book. Chris Hemsworth starred as Owen Chase and Benjamin Walker as Captain Pollard. Brendan Gleeson and Tom Holland portrayed the elder and younger Nickerson, respectively.
 German funeral doom band Ahab's second full length album, The Divinity of Oceans, is a concept album based on the events of the Essex. Several song titles are drawn directly from the event, such as "Gnawing Bones (Coffin's Lot)" and "Nickerson's Theme".
 The 2016 video game Tharsis was directly inspired by the events of the Essex, featuring a similar situation in a science fiction setting, where members of an unexpectedly crippled Mars mission can choose to use cannibalism as a last resort.
 American songwriter and YouTuber Rusty Cage dramatized the story of the Essex in the song "The Final Voyage of the Wailer's Essex", from his 2018 album Gangstalkers, Vol. 4. The song is sung from the perspective of first mate Owen Chase, and ends with the men drawing "bits of paper" from a cap to see who would first be cannibalized.

See also
Alexander Pearce
Custom of the sea, a set of customs practiced by the officers and crew of ships and boats in the open sea, which includes a discussion of cannibalism out of necessity
R v Dudley and Stephens (1884), a case involving cannibalism out of necessity
Uruguayan Air Force Flight 571
Donner Party
The French frigate Méduse

General
List of people who disappeared mysteriously at sea

References

Sources
 republished in 1965 as 

See also In the Heart of the Sea: The Tragedy of the Whaleship Essex

Further reading

External links

1799 ships
1820s missing person cases
Formerly missing people
Full-rigged ships
Herman Melville
Incidents of cannibalism
Maritime incidents in November 1820
Ships built in Amesbury, Massachusetts
Shipwrecks in the Pacific Ocean
Tall ships of the United States
Whale collisions with ships
Whaling ships
Maritime folklore